Pacôme Assi (born 25 February 1981) is a Ivorian-French kickboxer and Europe Kick Boxing Champion. He made his K-1 debut in 2009 at K-1 World Grand Prix 2009 in Lodz.

Career
He lost to Ondřej Hutník by unanimous decision at Nitrianska Noc Bojovnikov in Nitra, Slovakia on 27 October 2012.

He lost to Bruno Susano in an ISKA world heavyweight -95 kg title fight on points at FK-ONE in Paris, France, on 20 April 2013.

Assi lost to Roman Kriklya via TKO due to a cut in round one at Time Fight 3 in Tours, France on 15 June 2013.

Pacôme lost on points against Nicolas Wanba at "Warriors night 2" in Paris on 11 October 2014

He lost to D'Angelo Marshall by second round KO at the SuperKombat World Grand Prix 2013 Final Elimination in Ploiești, Romania on 9 november 2013.

After 2 years off, pacome assi came back in great shape to the Krush to be qualified for the K1 Tournament. 
He won his fight by KO at the 2nd round

Titles
 2015 Venum Victory World Series -95 kg Elimination Tournament Runner-up
 2015 K-1 Event Grand Prix 2015 Tournament Runner-up -96 kg 
 2013 Troyes Trophy Heavyweight - 8 Men Tournament runner up
 2012 Profight Karate Tournament Runner-up
 2011 Profight Tournament Karate Champion
 2008 French Kickboxing Champion 
 2008 DDS Kickboxing Tournament Champion
 2007 Europe Kickboxing Champion

Kickboxing record

References

1981 births
Living people
French male kickboxers
Cruiserweight kickboxers
Heavyweight kickboxers
Place of birth missing (living people)
SUPERKOMBAT kickboxers